The Super Akizuki-class destroyer (超秋月型駆逐艦 or 改秋月型駆逐艦, Chō Akizuki-class or Kai Akizuki-class) were a projected class of destroyer of the Imperial Japanese Navy (IJN), developed during the Second World War. The IJN Technical Department (艦政本部, Kansei-hombu) gave them the project number V7. However, the project was cancelled with none of the proposed ships being completed, because of the continued Japanese defeats.

Ships in class

Books
Rekishi Gunzo, History of Pacific War Vol.23 Akizuki class destroyers, Gakken (Japan), 1999, 
The Maru Special, Japanese Naval Vessels No.19 Destroyer Asashio class/Akizuki class, Ushio Shobō (Japan), 1978, Book code 8343-7
Collection of writings by Sizuo Fukui Vol.5, Stories of Japanese Destroyers, Kōjinsha (Japan) 1993, 

Destroyers of the Imperial Japanese Navy
Destroyer classes
Proposed ships